Henry & Elizabeth Parker Chipman House on E. 300 N. in American Fork, Utah was built in 1897.  It has also been known as the James E. & Eliza C. Peters House.  It was listed on the National Register of Historic Places in 2010.  The listing included two contributing buildings.

It includes Tudor Revival, Late Victorian, and English Cottage architecture.

The Delbert and Ora Chipman House, also in American Fork, is also NRHP-listed.

References

Houses completed in 1897
Houses on the National Register of Historic Places in Utah
Tudor Revival architecture in Utah
Houses in Utah County, Utah
Victorian architecture in Utah
Buildings and structures in American Fork, Utah
National Register of Historic Places in Utah County, Utah